Conesa is a municipality and village in the comarca of Conca de Barberà in the province of Tarragona in Catalonia, Spain.

References

External links
 Official website
 Government data pages 

Municipalities in Conca de Barberà